The Special London Bridge Special is a 1972 musical variety television special. It was made to celebrate the acquisition of the London Bridge in Lake Havasu City, Arizona. It was filmed in Lake Havasu following the opening of the London Bridge.

It was produced, directed and choreographed by David Winters and it starred Tom Jones and  Jennifer O'Neill. Other guests included The Carpenters, Kirk Douglas, Jonathan Winters, Hermione Gingold, Lorne Greene, Chief Dan George, Charlton Heston, George Kirby, Michael Landon, Terry-Thomas, Engelbert Humperdinck, Elliott Gould, Merle Park, and Rudolf Nureyev.

Synopsis 
Tom Jones catches a bus in London and is magically transported to Lake Havasu and the newly opened London Bridge. There he meets Jennifer O'Neill and a romance ensues which punctuated by musical and choreography interludes.

References

Lake Havasu City, Arizona
1970s musical films
Films directed by David Winters